The 2018 SAFF U-15 Championship was the fifth edition of the SAFF U-15 Championship, an international football competition for men's under-15 national teams organized by SAFF. The tournament was hosted by Nepal from October 25 to November 3, 2018, at ANFA Complex in Lalitpur, Nepal. Six out of seven teams from the region took part, as Sri Lanka later withdrew their team, and the teams were divided into two groups. On 3 November 2018, Bangladesh beat Pakistan to claim their second SAFF title.

Host selection
A draw for tournament ceremony was held on 13 September 2018 at conference room of Bangladesh Football Federation. 

BFF general secretary Abu Naeem Shohag, chairman of the BFF Media Committee Amirul Islam Babu and Mindu Dorji, the deputy general secretary of Bhutan Football Federation was also present on the occasion.

Initially all of seven countries team participated for the draw, two groups A and B were made, A consisted of Nepal, Bangladesh, Maldives and Pakistan and group B consisted of India, Bhutan and Sri Lanka

But later Sri Lanka had its team withdrawn from the tournament and the groups are redefined.

 † Sri Lanka withdrew before tournament
 ‡ Pakistan drawn to Group B, thus both the groups redefined

Squads
Players born on or after 1 January 2003 were eligible to compete in the tournament. Each team had to register a squad of minimum 18 players and maximum 23 players, minimum three of whom had to be goalkeepers.

Participating teams

Venues

Match officials

Referees
 Sudish Kumar Pandey (Nepal)
 Bhubon Mohon Tarafder (Bangladesh) 
 Zaeem Ali (Maldives) 
 Pema Tshewang (Bhutan) 
 Muhammad Ahmad Rauf (Pakistan)
 Harish Kundu (India)

Assistant Referees
 Yunal Malla (Nepal)
 Sk Ikball Alam (Bangladesh) 
 Jaufar Rasheed (Maldives) 
 Yonten Chophel (Bhutan) 
 Dilawar Khan (Pakistan)
 Kishan Joshi (India)

Group stage
All matches were played at Lalitpur, Nepal.
Times listed are UTC+05:45.

Group A

Group B

Bracket

Knockout stage
All matches will be played at Lalitpur, Nepal.
Times listed are UTC+05:45

Semi-finals

Third place

Final

Winner

Awards
The following awards were given for the 2018 SAFF U-15 Championship.

Goalscorers

References

2018
2018 in Asian football
2018
2018–19 in Nepalese football
2018–19 in Indian football
2018 in Bhutanese football
2018 in Bangladeshi football
2018 in Maldivian football
2018–19 in Pakistani football
2018 in youth association football
October 2018 sports events in Asia